Thunder Bay (Martin's Landing) Aerodrome  is an aerodrome located  west southwest of Thunder Bay, Ontario, Canada. Located at 1024 Boundary Drive W. Neebing Ontario P7L0C2

See also
 List of airports in the Thunder Bay area

References CML5 Administration 

Registered aerodromes in Ontario
Transport in Thunder Bay District